Dejan Stamenković (born 14 February 1983) is a Serbian football coach and a former player. He is an assistant coach with Jedinstvo Ub.

External links
 Profile in Srbijafudbal

Living people
1983 births
Footballers from Belgrade
Serbian footballers
FK Voždovac players
FK Hajduk Beograd players
FK Palilulac Beograd players
FK Jagodina players
FK Mladost Lučani players
FK Čukarički players
FK Borac Čačak players
FK Kolubara players
Serbian SuperLiga players
Serbian First League players
Association football defenders
Serbian football managers